The 1990–91 English Hockey League season took place from October 1990 until May 1991.

The Men's National League was sponsored by Poundstretcher and was won by Havant. The top four teams qualified to take part in the Poundstretcher League Cup tournament which was won by Hounslow. The Women's National League was sponsored by Typhoo and was won by Slough.

The Men's Hockey Association Cup was won by Hounslow and the Women's Cup (National Club Championship finals) was won by Sutton Coldfield.

Men's Poundstretcher National League First Division League Standings

Men's League Cup Tournament 

Hounslow
Richard Purvis, Owen Mackney, Mike Williamson, Jon Potter (capt), Guy Swayne, Jon Rees (Mike Rose sub), Dave Hacker, Andy Ferns, Nick Gordon (Guy Fordham sub), Robert Thompson, Mike Alcock (Andy Thompson sub) 
Havant
Jimmy Lewis, David Faulkner (capt), David Roberts, Rob Hill, Steve Lawson, A Cave, M Coleman, Russell Garcia, Stuart Avery, Colin Cooper, J Goldring (Gary Roberts sub)

Women's Typhoo National League First Division League Standings

Men's Nationwide Anglia Cup (Hockey Association Cup)

Quarter-finals

Semi-finals

Final 
(Held at Luton Town Football Club on 7 April)

Hounslow
Richard Purvis, Mike Williamson, Jon Potter (capt), Simon Hazlitt, Paul Bolland, Jon Rees, David Hacker, Andy Ferns, Nick Gordon, Robert Thompson, Andy Thompson (Mike Alcock sub) 
Havant
Sean Rowlands, David Faulkner (capt), David Roberts, Rob Hill, Peter Nail, Steve Lawson, M Coleman (J Golding sub), Russell Garcia, Don Williams, Colin Cooper, Stuart Avery (Gary Roberts sub)

Women's Cup (National Clubs Championship finals)

Group A (Ashford)

Group B (Canterbury)

Semi-finals

Final 
(Held at Ashford on 21 April)

References 

1990
field hockey
field hockey
1991 in field hockey
1990 in field hockey